Park Ji-yoon (born March 23, 1979) is a South Korean former announcer and host. She is currently a host of the variety show Gourmet Road and has been a cast member of JTBC's Crime Scene since 2014. Park Ji-yoon has been married to her former fellow KBS presenter Choi Dong-suk since 11 September 2009.

Filmography

TV series

Variety shows

Web shows

Awards and nominations

References

External links
 Official blog

1979 births
Living people
Mystic Entertainment artists
People from Seoul
South Korean television presenters
South Korean women television presenters
South Korean announcers
Soongsil University alumni